Fluocerite, also known as tysonite, is a mineral consisting of cerium and lanthanum fluorides, with the chemical formula . The end members are classified as two different mineral types depending on the cation, fluocerite-(Ce) and fluocerite-(La), corresponding respectively to lanthanum trifluoride and cerium trifluoride. Both crystallize in the trigonal system. 

Fluocerite-(Ce) was first described (without the Ce) in 1845 from hydrothermal veins in granite in Sweden. Fluocerite-(La) was first described in 1969 from the type locality in central Kazakhstan. The name tysonite was given in 1880 to the same type of mineral found in Colorado. Tysonite-type structure is used for rare-earth fluorides with the P3c1 space group structure.

References

Lanthanide minerals
Trigonal minerals
Minerals in space group 165
Fluorine minerals